Monobloc may refer to anything made of a single block or casting. Thus:

Monobloc engine, an internal combustion engine with the cylinder head and block formed as one unit
Monobloc (chair), a type of light-weight chair made of one piece of injection-moulded HDPE plastic

Also:
Monobloc (film), a 2005 Argentine film
Antoinette Monobloc, a pre-WWI French military monoplane
Monoblock LNB, a type of low-noise block downconverter
In photography, another name for a monolight, a type of electronic flash with the electronics in the head, as opposed to a pack-and-head system

See also

Monoblock (disambiguation)

Mono (disambiguation)
Bloc (disambiguation)